The Italian Trotter, is the Italian breed of trotting horse. It has been selectively bred exclusively for its racing ability. Varenne, one of the most successful trotters in the history of the sport, was an Italian Trotter.

History 

The Italian Trotter has been influenced by the French Trotter, the Russian Orlov Trotter and the American Standardbred. The move in recent years towards races over shorter distances has led to greater reliance on horses of the American type.

The first trotting races in the Italian peninsula were held in the Prato della Valle of Padova (which at that time was in the Napoleonic Kingdom of Italy) from 1808, some two years after the earliest official races at New Haven, Connecticut, in the United States. Selection of the Italian Trotter did not begin until the second half of the nineteenth century, when mares with aptitude for trotting were put to English Thoroughbred stallions. The first notable Italian trotting horse was Vandalo, foaled in Ferrara in 1862. A genealogical stud-book was opened in 1896. The stud-book is closed – only horses born to registered parents can be registered; however, trotters registered elsewhere can sometimes be admitted if their racing record is exceptional.

The most celebrated Italian Trotter is Varenne, foaled in 1995, who raced in seven countries, won 61 of his 73 races, and whose winnings of over €6 million are thought to be a record.

Characteristics 

The Italian Trotter has been selectively bred exclusively for its racing ability, particularly over short  and medium  distances; races over longer distances are no longer common in Italy. There is no breed standard or morphological requirement of any kind. The most common coat colours are bay, chestnut and black.

References

External links
 
 Varenne's website
 Varenne's World record
 Varenne at Fiera Cavalli

Horse breeds
Horse breeds originating in Italy